Goff Creek is a stream in Stone County in the Ozarks of southwest Missouri. It is a tributary of the James River.

The East Prong flows past Ponce de Leon and the West Prong flows north from Abesville on Missouri Route 176. The two converge and flow northwest under Missouri Route V and past White City on to join the James just south of the McCall Bridge.

Goff Creek has the name of John Goff, a pioneer settler.

See also
List of rivers of Missouri

References

Rivers of Stone County, Missouri
Rivers of Missouri